Ilie Fătu (born 18 April 1974) is a Romanian former weightlifter. He competed in the men's middleweight event at the 1996 Summer Olympics.

References

External links
 

1974 births
Living people
Romanian male weightlifters
Olympic weightlifters of Romania
Weightlifters at the 1996 Summer Olympics
Sportspeople from Bistrița
20th-century Romanian people
21st-century Romanian people